Anereuthinula is a monotypic moth genus of the family Noctuidae. Its only species, Anereuthinula lyncestidis, is found in Taiwan. Both the genus and species were first described by Strand in 1920.

References

Acronictinae
Noctuoidea genera
Monotypic moth genera